For the 1983 DeBarge album, see In a Special Way

In a Special Way is an album by American jazz pianist Gene Harris recorded in 1976 and released on the Blue Note label.

Reception
The Allmusic review by Stephen Thomas Erlewine awarded the album 4 stars, stating: "Harris crafted a record that revels in contemporary soul trends from the mid-'70s -- lite funk in the vein of EWF, disco, Philly soul, and vapid fusion. The production is heavy-handed and glossy, filled with drippy strings, thumping beats, wordless backing vocals, and silly synthesized effects. Through it all, Harris plays exactly like he always does, as if he were oblivious to his surroundings".

Track listing
 "Theme for Relana" (Skip Scarborough) - 6:35 
 "Rebop" (Ronaldo N. Jackson, Jerry Peters, John Rowin) - 3:58 
 "Zulu" (Peters) - 4:59 
 "Always in My Mind" (Bradley "Mbaji" Ridgell, Peters, Sigidi Abdullah) - 4:31 
 "Love for Sale" (Cole Porter) - 4:48 
 "It's Your Love" (R. Melendrez, Charlotte Politte, John Rowin) - 3:02 
 "Soft Cycles" (N. Brown) - 2:30 
 "Five/Four" (Charlotte Politte) - 3:44 
 "Naima" (John Coltrane) - 6:21 
Recorded at Total Experience Studios in Los Angeles, California, on March 29 (tracks 1 & 3), April 1 (tracks 4 & 9), April 2 (tracks 5 & 6), and April 7 (tracks 2, 7 & 8), 1976.

Personnel
Gene Harris - keyboards
George Bohanon - trombone
Sidney Muldrow, Marnie Robinson - French horn
Azar Lawrence - tenor saxophone
Ed Green - violin
Charlotte Politte - electric piano, synthesizer
Jerry Peters - electric piano, synthesizer, string ensemble, arranger, vocals
Lee Ritenour - guitar, electric guitar
Al McKay - electric guitar
John Rowin - electric guitar, arranger
Chuck Rainey, Verdine White - electric bass
James Gadson - drums
Harvey Mason - drums, percussion
Mayuto Correa - percussion
Phillip Bailey - percussion, vocals
Merry Clayton, Ann Esther Jessica, D.J. Rogers, Sigidi, Stephanie Spruill, Deniece Williams - vocals

References

Blue Note Records albums
Gene Harris albums
1976 albums
Albums produced by Jerry Peters
Albums recorded at Total Experience Recording Studios